Fairview is a town in Collin County, Texas, United States. It is part of the Dallas-Fort Worth metropolitan area. As of the 2017 census, the town population was 8,950. The estimated population in 2018 was 9,092. The town is adjacent to the  Heard Natural Science Museum and Wildlife Sanctuary.

History

A petition to request an incorporation election for Fairview was submitted to the county judge and commissioners' court on April 21, 1958, and following an election on May 7, 1958, and count of all 50 ballots, the town was incorporated, ordered by Collin County Judge W. E. Button.

Geography

It is bordered by McKinney, the county seat, to the north, by Allen to the west and south, and by Lucas to the southeast. Wilson Creek, a tributary of the East Fork Trinity River, forms part of the northeastern boundary.

Demographics

As of the 2020 United States census, there were 10,372 people, 3,681 households, and 2,629 families residing in the town.

Government

The city has a mayor–council government. The town council consists of a mayor and six council members.

Education

Fairview is served by two school schools districts, the Lovejoy Independent School District and the McKinney Independent School District.

References

External links
 Town of Fairview official website
 Lovejoy Independent School District
 McKinney Independent School District
 ePodunk: Profile for Fairview, Texas 
 City-Data.com
 Fairview, TX at Handbook of Texas Online

Dallas–Fort Worth metroplex
Towns in Collin County, Texas
Towns in Texas
Populated places established in 1958
1958 establishments in Texas